APEC Malaysia 2020 was the year-long hosting of Asia-Pacific Economic Cooperation (APEC) meetings in Malaysia from December 2019 until November 2020. Due to the COVID-19 pandemic, most of the meetings were held virtually, including the culminating Economic Leaders' Meeting.

This was Malaysia's second time hosting an APEC meeting, having hosted one in 1998.

After the virtual summit held on 20 November 2020, the APEC leaders issued the Kuala Lumpur Declaration.

Theme
The official theme of the APEC Malaysia 2020 is "Optimising Human Potential Towards a Resilient Future of Shared Prosperity: Pivot. Prioritise. Progress". It was chosen to reflect the Asia Pacific region's resilience, agility and inclusive economic growth through the concept of Shared Prosperity during the COVID-19 pandemic.

Logo
APEC Malaysia 2020 logo is an image of Malaysia's national flower, Hibiscus rosa-sinensis, known locally as Bunga Raya, literally meaning ‘celebratory flower’ which symbolises unity and diversity.

The 21 individual petals of the flower represents the spirit of unity of 21 APEC members in promoting regional economic integration, sustainable economic growth and prosperity in the Asia Pacific region, the different tone of red/maroon of the logo represents the diversity of the APEC members; the 3 pistils of different shades of blue in the centre that resemble the waves of the Pacific Ocean represents unity of all APEC members under its core principles of consensus, voluntary and non-binding; while the 14-pointed star represents the 14 states in Malaysia and the inspirations of APEC members after 2020.

Events

Attendees

This was the first APEC Meeting for Papua New Guinean Prime Minister James Marape, the host Malaysian Prime Minister Muhyiddin Yassin, Japanese Prime Minister Yoshihide Suga and Peruvian President Francisco Sagasti after their inaugurations and appointments on May 30, 2019, March 1, 2020, September 16, 2020 and November 17, 2020, respectively. It was also the last APEC meeting for United States President Donald Trump and the host, Malaysian Prime Minister Muhyiddin, who both stepped down on 20 January 2021 and 16 August 2021 following the 2020 United States presidential election and the inauguration of Joe Biden; and the 2020–2022 Malaysian political crisis, leading to Muhyiddin's resignation.

Two presidents who did not attend were Vietnamese President Nguyễn Phú Trọng and Mexican President Andrés Manuel López Obrador. Trọng sent Prime Minister Nguyễn Xuân Phúc in his place and López Obrador was represented by his Minister of Economy Graciela Márquez Colín, respectively.

Notes

References

See also 
 2020 G20 Riyadh summit in Riyadh, Saudi Arabia (held 21–22 November 2020)

External links
 
 
 
 

2020 in economics
Economy of Malaysia
Diplomatic conferences in Malaysia
2020 in international relations
2020 conferences
2020
2020 in Malaysia
Events affected by the COVID-19 pandemic